The 2008 Tunis Open was a 2008 ATP Challenger Series tennis tournament.

Seeds

Draw

Final four

External links
 International Tennis Federation (ITF) – tournament edition details

2008 Doubles
2008 ATP Challenger Series